The Philadelphia Phillies have participated in 140 seasons in Major League Baseball since their inception in 1883. They are the oldest continuous same-name, same-city franchise in all of American professional sports. Through October 1, 2022, they have played 21,203 games, winning 10,019 games and losing 11,184. 

Chuck Klein, the franchise's only batting Triple Crown winner, holds the most franchise records as of the end of the 2009 season, with eight, including career slugging percentage, career on-base plus slugging (OPS), and single-season extra-base hits. He is followed by Billy Hamilton, who holds seven records, including career batting average and the single-season runs record.

Several Phillies hold National League and major league records. Pitcher/outfielder John Coleman is the most decorated in this category, holding three major league records, all from the franchise's inaugural season. Coleman set records for losses, earned runs allowed, and hits allowed, all in 1883 when he also set three additional franchise pitching records. Shortstop Jimmy Rollins broke Willie Wilson's record for at-bats in a single season with 716 in 2007, and first baseman Ryan Howard also set the major league record for strikeouts in a single season that same year with 199, before it was broken by Mark Reynolds of the Arizona Diamondbacks the following year. The 1930 Phillies, who went 52–102, set two more National League records, allowing 1,993 hits and 1,193 runs in the regular season.

Individual career records
All statistics in this section are drawn from Baseball Reference using the following sources: batting statistics; pitching statistics.

Statistics are current through 2018 season.

Career batting

Career pitching

Individual single-season records
All statistics in this section are drawn from Baseball Reference using the following sources: batting statistics; pitching statistics.

Single-season batting

Single-season pitching

Team single-game records
All statistics in this section are drawn from the following source.

Single-game batting

Single-game pitching

Team season records
All statistics in this section are drawn from the following source.

Season batting

Season pitching

Notes
Jimmy Rollins hit in 36 straight games up to and including the final game of 2005. Hitting streak in one season and hitting streak over two seasons are considered two separate records by Major League Baseball. After tallying hits in the first two games of 2006, Rollins' streak officially ended at 38 over two seasons.

See also
Baseball statistics
Philadelphia Phillies award winners and league leaders

References
General reference

Inline citations

External links
Phillies all-time pitching records at Baseball-Reference.com
Phillies all-time batting records at Baseball-Reference.com
All-time Leaders. Philadelphia Phillies official website
Rare Feats. Philadelphia Phillies official website

Team rec
Major League Baseball team records
Records